Johann Conrad Klemm (1655–1717) was a Lutheran theologian of Germany.

Life 
Johann Conrad Klemm was born in Herrenberg, Württemberg, on 23 November 1655. He studied at Tübingen, became a deacon in Metzingen in 1683 and a clergyman in Stuttgart in 1688, in 1700 a professor at Tübingen and in 1711 a full professor of theology there. He died in Tübingen on 18 February 1717.

Works 
 Do voce βάρβαρος ad 1 Cor. xiv, 11;
 Vindiciæ Locorum Pentateuchis Corruptionis Accusatorum;
 De κοινωνίᾷ θείας φύσεως ad 2 Petr. i, 3, 4;
 De Concilio Benedicti XIII;
 De Papatu Hfierarchico;
 De Nominibus Hebraicis.

References

Sources 
 Pick, B. (1887). "Klemm, Johann Conrad". In McClintock, John; Strong, James (eds.). Cyclopædia of Biblical, Theological and Ecclesiastical Literature. Supplement.—Vol. 2. New York: Harper & Brothers. p. 637.
 Schott, Theodor (1882). "Klemm, Johann Conrad". In Allgemeine Deutsche Biographie (ADB). Vol. 16. Leipzig: Duncker & Humblot. pp. 153–154.

1655 births
1717 deaths
17th-century German Protestant theologians
18th-century German Protestant theologians
17th-century German Lutheran clergy
Academic staff of the University of Tübingen